Wote is a town in Kenya. It is the capital of Makueni County in the former Eastern Province. It forms a town council with a population of 56,419, of whom 5,542 are classified urban (1999 census).

Wote town has six wards: Kako, Kaumoni, Kikumini, Muvau, Nziu and Wote. Most of them are located in Makueni Constituency, but Kako ward belongs to Mbooni Constituency and Kaumoni ward to Kaiti Constituency. Wote is also headquarters of Wote division of Makueni District.

References 

Makueni County
Populated places in Makueni County
County capitals in Kenya